Daniel E. Straus is an American business executive, entrepreneur, venture capitalist, real estate developer and philanthropist. He is the founder or co-founder of several health care companies such as CareOne LLC, InnovaCare Health, Ascend Home Health, Ascend Concierge Home Care, Ascend Hospice, Partners Pharmacy, The Straus Group, Multicare Companies Inc. He also became vice chairman of the Memphis Grizzlies professional basketball team.

Career
Straus was born to an Orthodox Jewish family and attended Columbia University, graduating with a B.A. degree in political science. Straus went on to earn a J.D. degree from New York University School of Law, and became a lawyer for at Paul, Weiss, Rifkind, Wharton & Garrison in New York City.

In 1984 Straus left the law firm to co-found the health care company Multicare Companies Inc. with his brother Moshael. Straus served as co-CEO and president of the new company, which owned four nursing homes inherited from their father, Joseph. Under the direction of the Straus brothers the company increased revenue and profitability through a combination of high-quality care, specialty services, high occupancy rates and profitable payer profiles. In 1993, Multicare Companies Inc. became a public enterprise, eventually selling to Genesis Health Ventures, Inc. in 1997 for $1.06 billion.

Following the success of Multicare, Straus continued to grow businesses in the healthcare industry. In 1999, Straus founded and became chairman and CEO of CareOne LLC, which operates over 70 nursing homes and assisted living facilities in the New England area, admitting over 20,000 patients per year. In 2006, Straus co-founded and is chairman and chief executive officer of Aveta, Inc., and InnovaCare Health Solutions, LLC, which are managed health plans. Straus also has holdings in other health care businesses such as Ascend Concierge Home Care, Ascend Home Health, Ascend Hospice, Care Realty, Care Missouri, CareVirginia, HealthBridge Management, and Partners Pharmacy.

In addition to health care businesses, Straus founded and manages The Straus Group, which invests in hedge funds, sports and entertainment assets, private equity and real estate. In 2010, his JZS Madison, LLC company purchased 6 brownstones and 2 townhouses on Madison Avenue in New York City for commercial and residential development.

Straus also founded Bridge Sports, LLC, which from 2012 to 2018 was a minority owner of the Memphis Grizzlies, a professional basketball team in the NBA. Straus became vice chairman of the team in 2012.

Philanthropy

In 2014, Straus and CareOne LLC founded The CareOne Cancer Fund in honor of its longtime executive Dan Grimes, who was diagnosed with advanced lung cancer. The CareOne Cancer Fund was created to help raise support for employees of CareOne during and after cancer treatments. The campaign hosted over 100 fundraising events and concluded with a concert at Fenway Park in Boston and the eventual donation of over $1.3 million.

In 2016, Straus and CareOne LLC organized a charity event which raised $1.7 million for the Breast Cancer Research Foundation (BCRF).

References

1956 births
American health care chief executives
Living people
Columbia College (New York) alumni
New York University School of Law alumni
People from Englewood, New Jersey
Paul, Weiss, Rifkind, Wharton & Garrison people